St. Peter's Lutheran Church may refer to:

St. Peter's Lutheran Church in Dell Rapids, South Dakota, United States
St. Peter's Lutheran Church in Warrane, Tasmania, Australia
St. Peter's Lutheran Church in Kinde, Michigan, United States
St. Peter's Lutheran Church under the Citigroup Center in Manhattan, New York, United States
St. Peter's Lutheran Church in Monrovia, Liberia, scene of the Monrovia Church massacre
St. Peter's Lutheran Church in Ottawa, Ontario, Canada
St. Peter's Lutheran Church and School in Walmore, New York, United States